West Indies B is a List A cricket team that participates in the West Indian domestic List A tournament and was formerly also a first-class cricket team that participated in the West Indian domestic First Class competition from the 2000–01 season to the 2003–04 season. It is selected by the West Indies Cricket Board (WICB) from players who had been unable to secure a contract with one of the seven other existing regional teams, and is restricted to players under the age of 23 (with a few exceptions). West Indies B had little on-field success during its time in the competition (although a number of future internationals spent time in its squad), and the team was disbanded prior to the 2004–05 season after a wider reorganisation of domestic cricket in the region. It was reconstituted in June 2018 for participation in the inaugural Global T20 Canada competition with the intention of exposing and adding to the development of developing players who could become future international players. It subsequently participated in the 2018–19 Regional Super50 competition and in the 2019–20 Regional Super50 (where it was named as West Indies Emerging Team). The team has enjoyed more success in the List A format than it did in the First Class format, as it placed third in its group in the 2018-19 season (after suffering the most no results of any team in the group) and won the 2019-20 season.

History
The West Indies Cricket Board (WICB) introduced the West Indies B team for the 2000–01 Busta Cup. Mike Findlay, the WICB's chairman of selectors, said that the team was introduced to give "young players the incentive to go on playing", as a number of young players were quitting cricket after under-19 level because they could not secure a contract with one of the regional teams. Selection for West Indies B was restricted to players under the age of 23, but for the first two seasons the team was captained by an experienced older player (Richie Richardson in 2000–01 and Roland Holder in 2001–02).

West Indies B played a total of 28 matches across four seasons, winning just four matches during that time. In the 2000–01 Busta Cup, the team placed seventh out of eight teams, winning only against the Windward Islands (by 162 runs). West Indies B finished eighth the following season, again winning only once (defeating Bangladesh A by 59 runs). The team was winless in the 2002–03 Carib Beer Cup, but in the 2003–04 Carib Beer Cup won two matches to finish sixth overall. It had a higher turnover of players during its four seasons, with only nine players playing more than one season with the team.

In a reorganisation of West Indian cricket prior to the 2004–05 season, it was decided to disband West Indies B and return to the old format of six regional teams, which had last been used during the 1995–96 season. The extended competitions were said to have "burdened a financially insecure organisation with heavy running costs", while also diluting the standard of play.

It was reconstituted in June 2018 for participation in the inaugural Global T20 Canada competition where upon it won four and lost two of its six matches in the group stage to enter the playoff stage. It won its first playoff (against eventual champions Vancouver Knights) to enter the final which it lost to the same team. In total the team played 8 matches in the tournament, of which it won 5 and lost 3.

In the 2018–19 Regional Super50 competition the team played a total of 8 matches, winning 2 and losing 2 and experiencing 4 no results (the most of any team in its group), and placed third in the group and did not advance to the semi-finals. The team (as the West Indies Emerging Team) had a much better showing in the 2019–20 Regional Super50 season. It played 8 matches in the group stage, winning 4 and losing 3 and only experiencing 1 no result, placing second in the group and advancing to the semi-finals. The team beat Barbados in the first semi-final to advance to the final. They beat the Leeward Islands by 205 runs  to win their first title in the competition.

List of players

Players in bold played international cricket for the West Indies, either before or after playing for West Indies B. Players marked with an asterisk (*) played their only first-class cricket for West Indies B.

  Camilus Alexander
  Zaheer Ali
  Fabian Allen
  Krishna Arjune
  Vishal Arjune*
  Alick Athanaze
  Ryan Austin
  Lionel Baker
  Carlton Baugh
  Ronsford Beaton
  Sulieman Benn
  Jason Bennett
  David Bernard
  Camarie Boyce
  Anthony Bramble
  Patrick Browne
  Yannic Cariah
  Roland Cato
  Bryan Charles
  Cephas Cooper
  Joshua Da Silva
  Narsingh Deonarine
  Dominic Drakes
  Shawn Findlay
  Assad Fudadin
  Dennis George
  Andrew Gonsalves
  Justin Greaves
  Derval Green
  Reon Griffith
  Keon Harding
  Jason Haynes
  Chaka Hodge
  Kavem Hodge
  Chemar Holder
  Roland Holder
  Danza Hyatt
  Tevin Imlach
  Lorenzo Ingram
  Amit Jaggernauth
  Denzil James
  Shane Jeffers
  Leonardo Julien
  Kirstan Kallicharan
  Aneil Kanhai
  Brandon King
  Jermaine Lawson
  Jermaine Levy
  Callitos Lopez
  Jeremiah Louis
  Gregory Mahabir
  Kenroy Martin
  Antonio Mayers
  Obed McCoy
  Kimani Melius
  Satish Naidoo*
  Ashmead Nedd
  Martin Nurse
  Ryan Nurse
  Donovan Pagon
  Kenroy Peters
  Wayne Phillip
  Khary Pierre
  Nicholas Pooran
  Gidron Pope
  Elsroy Powell
  Ryan Ramdass
  Denesh Ramdin
  Austin Richards
  Andrew Richardson
  Richie Richardson
  Jeavor Royal
 Sherfane Rutherford
  Marlon Samuels
  Jayden Seales
  Anderson Sealy
  Keagan Simmons
  Lendl Simmons
  Kevin Sinclair
  Odean Smith
  Rodney Sooklal
  Shamar Springer
  Antonio Thomas
  Rayon Thomas
  Dwight Washington
  Kurt Wilkinson
  Tonito Willett
  Kenroy Williams

See also
 Cricket Australia XI, a similar team for Australian players
 Unicorns, a similar team for English players

References

West Indian first-class cricket teams